The Yemen Eyalet was an eyalet (province) of the Ottoman Empire. Although formally an integral part of the empire, the far-flung province was notoriously difficult to administer, and was often lawless. During the early 17th century, the Eyalet was entirely lost to the Yemeni Zaidi State, only to be recovered by the Ottomans two centuries later. The Yemen Eyalet was reorganized in 1849, upon Ottoman takeover of much of Greater Yemen territories. In 1872, most of it became Yemen Vilayet after a land reform in the empire.

History
In 1516, the Mamluks of Egypt annexed Yemen; but in the following year, the Mamluk governor surrendered to the Ottomans, and Turkish armies subsequently overran the country. They were challenged by the Zaidi Imam, Qasim the Great (r. 1597–1620), and by 1636, the Zaydi tribesmen had driven the Ottomans out of the country completely.

Governors
First Ottoman period
 Mustafa Pasha al-Nashshar (1539/40–1549)
 Özdemir Pasha (1549–1554)
 Mustafa Pasha al-Nashshar (1554–1555/56)
 Kara Shahin Mustafa Pasha (1556–1560)
 Mahmud Pasha (1561–1565)
 Ridwan Pasha (1565–1567)
 Özdemiroğlu Osman Pasha (1569–1573)
 Murad Pasha (1576–1580)
 Hasan Pasha (1580–1604)
 Ja'far Pasha (1607–1616)
 Mehmed Pasha (1616–1621)
 Ahmad Fadli Pasha (1622–1624)
 Haydar Pasha (1624–1629)
 Aydin Pasha (1628–1630)
 Qansuh Pasha (1629–1635)

Second Ottoman period
 Mustafa Sabri Pasha (May 1850–March 1851)
 Mehmed Sirri Pasha (March 1851–October 1851)
 Bonaparta Mustafa Pasha (October 1851–May 1852)
 Kürt Mehmed Pasha (May 1852–May 1856)
 Babanli Ahmed Pasha (1st time) (May 1856–December 1862)
 Musullu Ali Yaver Pasha (December 1862–August 1864)
 Babanli Ahmed Pasha (August 1864–February 1867)
 Tacirli Ahmed Pasha (February 1867–March 1869)
 Halepli Ali Pasha (March 1869–May 1871)
 Topal Bursali Mehmed Redif Pasha (May 1871–August 1871)
Succeeded by the Yemen Vilayet

Administrative divisions
Sanjaks of the Eyalet in the mid-19th century:
 Sanjak of Mokha
 Sanjak of Eharish (Abu `Arish?)
 Sanjak of Massu

See also
 Yemen Vilayet of the Ottoman Empire
 Islamic history of Yemen

References

Eyalets of the Ottoman Empire in Asia
Ottoman period in Yemen
1517 establishments in the Ottoman Empire
1872 disestablishments in the Ottoman Empire
1849 establishments in the Ottoman Empire
16th century in Yemen
17th century in Yemen
19th century in Yemen